Ibrahim Shikanda Chimwanga (born 27 August 1984 in Nairobi) is a retired Kenyan soccer player who currently works as assistant coach of Tanzanian Premier League side Azam FC

Career
Shikanda began his career in the youth side for Tusker FC and was 2003 promoted to the seniorside. After two years for Tusker in the Kenyan Premier League joined to league rival Mumias Sugar. He left than in summer 2007 his club Mumias Sugar to sign for Uganda's Rock Star. Shikanda signed for Azam FC at the beginning of 2008.
In 2012, Shikanda signed for up-and-coming Conference Premier side Kettering Town.

International career
Shikanda has come through Kenya's ranks having featured for the U17, U20 and U23 sides before making it to the Senior team - Harambee Stars.

References

1984 births
Living people
Kenyan footballers
Kenya international footballers
Kenyan expatriate footballers
Expatriate footballers in Tanzania
Expatriate footballers in Uganda
Kenyan expatriate sportspeople in Tanzania
Kenyan expatriate sportspeople in Uganda
Tusker F.C. players
Azam F.C. players
Association football defenders
Kenyan expatriate sportspeople in England